Presidencies and Provinces of British India were collectively known as "British India". They were the administrative units of the British Empire between 1612 and 1947. It included Burma till 1937, but generally doesn't include the Indian Princely States or British protectorates in South Asia.

British India may also refer to:
Company rule in India (1757–1858)
British Raj (1858–1947) known as the "Indian Empire"
A collective term for the British in India, usually for the domiciled ones, during the period 1757 to 1947.  In the period up to 1900, they were also commonly called Anglo-Indians; later that term came to mean people of mixed South Asian and British descent.

See also
British India (band), a garage rock band based in Australia